Khatik Mohalla is the name of a village or locality where Hindu Khatik people live and may refer to:

 Khatik Mohalla (Jabalpur), Madhya Pradesh
 Khatik Mohalla (Meerut), Uttar Pradesh
 Khatik Mohalla (Mathura Cantt), Uttar Pradesh
 Khatik Mohalla (Shahpura), see Khatik Mohalla Street, Rajasthan

See also
Khatik, an ethnic group
Khatik (surname)